The Pointe de Tourtemagne (also known as Turtmannspitze) is a mountain of the Swiss Pennine Alps, located east of St. Luc in the canton of Valais. It lies between the valleys of Anniviers and Turtmann.

References

External links
 Pointe de Tourtemagne on Hikr

Mountains of the Alps
Alpine three-thousanders
Mountains of Switzerland
Mountains of Valais